Eberstein may refer to:

Eberstein, Austria, a town in Carinthia in Austria
County of Eberstein, a noble family in south-west Germany, centred on Alt Eberstein castle
Alt Eberstein castle, former home to the above